Marne can refer to:

Places

France
Marne (river), a tributary of the Seine
Marne (department), a département in northeastern France named after the river
La Marne, a commune in western France
Marne, a legislative constituency (France)

Netherlands
De Marne, a municipality in Groningen, the Netherlands
Marne tram stop in Amstelveen, the Netherlands

United States
Marne, Iowa, a small city
Marne, Michigan, an unincorporated community
Marne, Ohio, a census-designated place
Marne, West Virginia, an unincorporated community

Other
Marne, Germany, a town in Schleswig-Holstein
Marne (Italy), frazione in the commune of Filago
Marne River (South Australia)

Military uses
Military actions
First Battle of the Marne, 1914, one of the bloodiest battles of World War I
Second Battle of the Marne, 1918, an Allied victory during World War I
Operation Marne, a 2004 Iraq War counterinsurgency operation

Ships
HMS Marne, two Royal Navy destroyers
, a number of French Navy vessels

Other
Marne Barracks, a former Royal Air Force base in Yorkshire, England

People
Marino Marne Intrieri (1907–1969), American football player
Marne Levine (born 1971/72), American businesswoman
Marne Maitland (1920–1991), Anglo-Indian actor
Marnette Patterson (born 1980), American actress
Jean-Louis de Marne (1752–1829), French painter
Marius Mârne (born 1977), Romanian football player

See also
Marna (disambiguation)
Marnes (disambiguation)